Brammah Parvat (also known as Nikurch Rama) is a mountain in the Uttarakhand state of India.

Location 

References 

Six-thousanders of the Himalayas